Emmett Hawkins Poindexter (November 6, 1892 – October 21, 1945) was an American physician and politician who served in the Virginia House of Delegates from 1938 to 1944, representing his native Louisa County.

References

External links 

1892 births
1945 deaths
Democratic Party members of the Virginia House of Delegates
20th-century American politicians
United States Army personnel of World War I
People from Louisa, Virginia